Reflections is an American progressive metalcore band formed in the Twin Cities, Minnesota, United States, in 2010. Their logo is the Japanese Kanji , meaning king.

History
On April 28, 2012, Reflections released their debut album, The Fantasy Effect, which was home-produced and recorded by the band using Mixcraft 4, a Windows music recording and mixing program. Soon after releasing The Fantasy Effect, Reflections were signed to record labels eOne and Good Fight. Reflections' second album and record label debut, titled Exi(s)t, was released October 22, 2013. The album's first single, "My Cancer," was released for download through iTunes and all other digital retailers on September 10, 2013. Reflections simultaneously released a lyric video for the single through their YouTube channel. Exi(s)t debuted at #179 on the Billboard 200 chart, selling 1,972 copies within one week of release.

It was announced that work for the band's third album would commence sometime in February 2015. On August 18, 2015, they released a music video for the song "Actias Luna" from the then upcoming album. Later, the album title was revealed as The Color Clear and was released through eOne and Good Fight on September 18, 2015. It was their best numbers and charting to date with a first week total of 3,025 copies sold and debuting at #6 on the Heatseekers Albums Chart, #15 on the Independent Albums and #96 on the Billboard 200 Chart.

In late 2016, the band announced that they were to stop touring and take an indefinite hiatus.

In late 2019, the band announced the hiatus would be ending and releasing a song on December 11, 2019. Francis was welcomed back to the band along with new member Logan Young. On February 20, 2020, the band released their fourth album, Willow, featuring a much heavier, chaotic style similar to Exi(s)t era.

In 2022, to celebrate the 10 year anniversary of the band's debut album, Reflections released The Fantasy Effect: Redux, a completely re-recorded and re-arranged version of their debut full-length The Fantasy Effect. In February 2023, vocalist Jake Wolf started the side project called "Surgeon".

Musical style and influences 
Reflections has been described as progressive metal, metalcore, and djent. They use seven-string guitars tuned to Drop F tuning (F–C–F–A–D–G–C).

Their influences include bands such as Pantera, August Burns Red, Gojira, the Tony Danza Tapdance Extravaganza, After the Burial, Born of Osiris, Architects, Structures, and Veil of Maya.

Band members 
Current
 Jake Wolf – lead vocals (2010–present), drums (2011–2012)
 Patrick "Patty" Somoulay – guitar (2010–present)
 Francis Xayana – bass (2010–2016, 2019–present)
 Nick Lona – drums (2014–present; touring 2013)

Former
 Boris "Bo" Blood – drums (2010–2011)
 Alex Curry - guitar (2010-2011)
 Cam Murray – drums (2012–2014)
 Charles Caswell – guitar (2011–2014) 
 Logan Young - guitar (2019–2021) 

 Timeline

Tours

2012
Midwest Madness tour from October 7 to 14 with After the Burial and The Contortionist.

2013
 Goodfight North American Tour from March 30 to April 11 with The Contortionist, Within the Ruins, I Declare War and City in the Sea.
 Heavy MTL South of the border tour from July 30 to August 17 with All Shall Perish, Oceano, Within the Ruins, and Betrayal.
 Co-Headliner tour from October 19 to 30 with Erra.
 Small east coast run from November 29 to December 7 with Within the Ruins, Sworn In and Legion.

2014
 Celebrate the Chaos tour from January 30 to February 23 with Chimaira, Iwrestledabearonce, Oceano and Fit for an Autopsy.
 they toured U.S.A from March 7 to 22 with Veil of Maya and Erra.
 On May 15 – June 8 they toured U.S.A with For The Fallen Dreams, Obey The Brave, I The Breather and  Sylar.
 In the Summer they toured North America from July 15 to August 21 with Scale the Summit, Glass Cloud, Erra, and Monuments.
 In the Fall they toured from September 16 to October 9 with After the Burial, Texas in July, I Declare War and Come the Dawn.
 From November 9 to 20 they toured with Betraying the Martyrs and Invent, Animate. The remainder of the tour past November 14 was cancelled after Betraying the Martyrs were denied entry into Canada.

2015
 On September 5–24 the band did a headlining tour with Toothgrinder, Exalt and Yüth Forever.
 From November 5 to December 11 the band embarked on Texas in July's farewell tour with Invent, Animate and To The Wind.

2016
 The Fury Tour from April 2 to 15 alongside labelmates Unearth, Ringworm, Culture Killer and Hollow Earth.
 Japan Tour with Protest the Hero, Cyclamen and Sithu Aye.

Discography 
Studio albums

Extended plays

Singles
 "Advance upon Me Brethren" (2011)
 "My Cancer" (2013)
 "Vain Words from Empty Minds" (2013)
 "Actias Lunas" (2015)
 "Shadow Self" (2015)
 "From Nothing" (2019)
 "Samsara" (2020)
 "Help" (2020)
"Cicada" (2021)
"Noir" (2021)
"Coda" (2021)

References

External links 
 

American progressive metal musical groups
Metalcore musical groups from Minnesota
American mathcore musical groups
Musical groups from the Twin Cities
Musical groups established in 2010
2010 establishments in Minnesota